Verkhnekasinovo is a rural locality and the administrative center of Brezhnevsky Selsoviet Rural Settlement, Kursky District, Kursk Oblast, Russia. Population:

Geography 
The village is located 93 km from the Russia–Ukraine border, 14 km north-west of Kursk.

 Climate
Verkhnekasinovo has a warm-summer humid continental climate (Dfb in the Köppen climate classification).

Transport 
Verkhnekasinovo is located 2.5 km from the federal route  Crimea Highway (a part of the European route ), on the road of intermunicipal significance  ("Crimea Highway" – Verkhnyaya Medveditsa – Razinkovo), 15 km from the nearest railway halt Bukreyevka (railway line Oryol – Kursk).

The rural locality is situated 18 km from Kursk Vostochny Airport, 136 km from Belgorod International Airport and 218 km from Voronezh Peter the Great Airport.

References

Notes

Sources

Rural localities in Kursky District, Kursk Oblast